Jisna Mathew (born 7 January 1999) is an Indian sprinter from Kerala.

Career
She represented India at the 2016 Summer Olympics held at Rio de Janeiro, Brazil.

She also won silver medals for 400m in 2015 Commonwealth Youth Games and 2015 Asian Youth Athletics Championships .

She also won two gold medals for 400m and 4×400m in 2016 Asian Junior Athletics Championships. And she won three medals Gold medal in 400m , silver medal in 4×400m and a bronze 200m  in 2018 Asian Junior Athletics Championships.

In 2017, she won a silver medal in 400m and won a gold medal as a part of the winning 4x400m relay team at the 2017 Asian Athletics Championships in Bhubaneshwar along with Debashree Mazumdar, M. R. Poovamma and Nirmala Sheoran.
She along with Indian Team members finished 7th and set a national record in 4×400 m mixed relay final in 2019 World athletic championship nad qualified for Tokyo Olympics.

References

External links

Living people
1999 births
Sportswomen from Kerala
Indian female sprinters
21st-century Indian women
21st-century Indian people
Olympic athletes of India
Athletes (track and field) at the 2016 Summer Olympics
World Athletics Championships athletes for India